Pull tab may refer to:

 Tab (beverage can), a built-in device used to open a beverage can
 Pull-tab, a game using gambling tickets
 Battery Pull tab, A strip of Stretch-To-Release adhesive found in some modern smartphones and tablets used to adhere the Lithium Battery to the device's housing.

See also
 Pull (disambiguation)
 Tab (disambiguation)